HMS Vengeful was a Second World War British submarine of the V class.

Construction
Vengeful was built at Vickers Armstrong, Barrow-in-Furness, U.K. between July 1943 and July 1944.

Service history
Vengeful served in the RN from October 1944 to April 1945.

Greek service

Vengeful was lent to the Greek Navy from April 1945 until 1957 where she served as Delfin (Y-9).

References
 

 

British V-class submarines
1944 ships
Ships built in Barrow-in-Furness